Rebecca Marie Bross (born July 11, 1993) is an American former artistic gymnast and six-time World Championship medalist.

Personal life 
Rebecca Marie Bross is the daughter of Terry Bross and Donna Bross. She has one older brother named Benjamin. She married Billy Burks December 17, 2022. Her parents put her in a gymnastics class at the age of five.   She was coached by Valeri Liukin at WOGA Gymnastics in Plano, Texas.

Career 
Rebecca Bross first qualified to Junior International Elite in 2005, when she also qualified to her first U.S. Nationals. She placed 16th all-around and earned a spot on the national team. She then competed in a few international assignments over the next year. At the 2006 U.S. Nationals, Rebecca placed fourth all-around, which also qualified her to the Junior Pan American Games Team. In 2007, she was again selected for the Pan American Games team. She finished second all-around, behind teammate Shawn Johnson. At the 2007 U.S. Championships, Rebecca won her first national championships title, despite a fall. She later won the Junior Japan Invitational.

Rebecca was able to compete in some Classics and Invitationals in early 2008. She competed with WOGA teammate Nastia Liukin at the Pacific Rim Championships, where she won gold medals in the all-around and on beam, bars and floor. She sat out the rest of the year because of a broken foot.

On July 25, 2009, at the Covergirl Classic in Des Moines, Iowa, Rebecca competed on the uneven bars, scoring a 13.150 (.050 better than her teammate Ivana Hong), but was unable to compete on floor, beam or vault because of an ankle injury suffered during practice a few days earlier. She competed her bars routine without a dismount, thus lowering her overall score.

In August 2009, Rebecca finished third all-around behind Bridget Sloan (first) and Ivana Hong (second) at the U.S. National Championships. Rebecca also placed third on balance beam and second on floor to end a successful first senior Nationals.

The following October, at the World Championships in London, England, Rebecca qualified in first place into the all-around final. She also qualified second on uneven bars and eighth on floor exercise. She fell on her beam dismount in preliminaries, which prevented her from qualifying on that event. In the all-around final, Rebecca led the competition going into the final rotation by a sizeable margin, having received the top scores of the competition on both bars and beam. Needing only a 12.925 to clinch the gold, she fell on her final tumbling pass on floor and just missed that score (the judges awarded her a 12.875). Her teammate Bridget Sloan claimed the gold, while Rebecca took the silver. Rebecca tied Romania's Ana Porgras for the bronze medal in the uneven bars event final, as well as in the floor final, where they both placed fifth.

In March 2010, she won the all-around at the American Cup. Rebecca won every event with the exception of the vault, which was won by Aly Raisman. In April, she won the senior all-around title at the Pacific Rim Championships in Melbourne, Australia. At the 2010 Visa Championships, Rebecca finished Day 1 with a two-point lead. On Day 2, she finished with a three-point lead, clinching the event to become the 2010 national champion. She was selected for the women's team for the 2010 World Artistic Gymnastics Championships in Rotterdam, Netherlands. There, she helped the United States win a silver medal behind the newly dominant Russian team. In the all-around, after a fall on beam, she bounced back on floor to get the bronze medal, scoring a 15.233 — the highest score given on floor to any women in the entire meet. Russia's Aliya Mustafina was the winner, and China's Jiang Yuyuan was the silver medalist. In event finals, Rebecca clinched the bronze on the uneven bars and tied with China's Deng Linlin for the silver on the balance beam behind Romania's Porgras.

During Night 2 of competition at the 2011 Visa Championships, Rebecca dislocated her right kneecap during a third-rotation vault. Because of the injury, Rebecca sat out of competition for the remainder of the 2011 season. Despite this, she earned a second-place finish on floor exercise, with a two-night total of 29.50.  She also placed eighth on beam (27.6).

2012 Olympic Trials 
In the Summer of 2012, Rebecca Bross competed in the Olympic Trials in hopes of making the Olympic team for London. She competed on the beam and uneven bars, finishing in last place on both. Despite an excellent routine on the first night of competition, Rebecca fell three times off the bars on Night 2 and was instructed by her coach to stop mid-routine. As a result of her low scores, particularly on the uneven bars — an area in which National Team Coordinator Márta Károlyi stated that the women's team would need strong competitors — Rebecca did not make the main Olympic team, nor was she named as an alternate. Sports commentators speculated that Rebecca' defeat at the Trials would likely be a career-ending one because of her previous injuries and age.

Post-competitive career 
Bross has not officially announced retirement, but she has not competed since the Olympic Trials in 2012 and is currently not training. She is regarded by some gymnastics fans as "one of the most unfortunate and unluckiest gymnasts" because of the injuries she suffered. In the four-year period from 2008–12, she incurred four injuries, including a broken foot, dislocated knee and other ankle and knee injuries that could have been serious.

Since September 2013, Bross has been a coach at Iarov Elite Gymnastics in Dallas, Texas. As of 2022, Bross completed her studies at University of Texas Southwestern Medical Center to become a physical therapist.

Routines 
As of 2011, Bross performed the following skills on these apparatus:

Floor music 
2011: "Beethoven Virus"

2010: "Dark Eyes"

2005-2009: "National Treasure Suite" from the National Treasure Soundtrack
Jh

Competitive history

References

External links
 
 Rebecca Bross Bio
 
 Rebecca Bross official website (not working as of 2021)
 Gymnastike Videos of Rebecca Bross (link broken as of 2021)

1993 births
Living people
Medalists at the World Artistic Gymnastics Championships
American female artistic gymnasts
Sportspeople from Ann Arbor, Michigan
Gymnasts at the 2007 Pan American Games
Pan American Games gold medalists for the United States
Pan American Games silver medalists for the United States
World Olympic Gymnastics Academy
Pan American Games medalists in gymnastics
Gymnasts from Texas
U.S. women's national team gymnasts
Medalists at the 2007 Pan American Games
21st-century American women
20th-century American women